Franz Schubert (31 January 1797 – 19 November 1828) was an Austrian composer.

This is a concordance of those compositions by Schubert that were given opus numbers, and their corresponding Deutsch catalogue numbers.

Background
Only a small minority of Schubert's works were published in his lifetime. Not all published works were allocated opus numbers, and the sequence of opus numbers that were allocated bore little relationship to the order in which the works were either composed or published. For example, the first of his works to be published, the song "Die Forelle", was given the opus number 32.

After Schubert's death in 1828, a number of his works were published with posthumous opus numbers. This practice was discontinued after the publication of Op. 173, in 1867.

Otto Erich Deutsch (1883–1967) was an Austrian musicologist. He is known for compiling the first comprehensive catalogue of Schubert's works: Schubert: Thematic Catalogue of all his Works in Chronological Order. This was first published in English in 1951, and subsequently revised for a new edition in German, in 1978.

Concordance
The table includes the following information:
 Opus Number – the opus number of the original publication of the work, when applicable; "(p)" or "posth." indicates a posthumous publication
 D – the catalogue number assigned by Otto Erich Deutsch
 Date of composition – the known or assumed date of composition, when available
 Date of publication – the first date of publication of the work
 Title – The title of the work in an English translation from German
 Incipit – the first line(s) of text, as pertaining to vocal works
 Scoring – the instrumentation and/or vocal forces required for the work
 Informal title – any additional names by which the work is known, when applicable
 Version – the number of versions as it pertains to works that have more than one version of the same setting
 Setting – the order of setting as it pertains to vocal works that have numerous settings of the same text
 Former Deutsch Number – information on Deutsch numbers that have been reassigned, when applicable
 Notes – any additional information concerning the work: alternate titles, completeness, relation to other works, authorship, etc.

References
Badura-Skoda, Eva and Peter Branscombe. Schubert Studies: Problems of Style and Chronology. Cambridge University Press, 1982.
Deutsch, Otto Erich; et al. Franz Schubert, thematisches Verzeichnis seiner Werke in chronologischer Folge. Bärenreiter, 1978. 
Newbould, Brian. Schubert: The Music and the Man. University of California Press, 1999.
Talia Pecker Berio (ed). Franz Schubert: Neue Ausgabe sämtlicher Wërke. Series I. Volume 1a "Messen Ia". Kassel: Bärenreiter, 1990.
Rossana Dalmonte and Pier Paolo Scattolin (eds). Franz Schubert: Neue Ausgabe sämtlicher Wërke. Series I. Volume 2 "Messen II". Kassel: Bärenreiter, 1982.
Doris Finke-Hecklinger (ed). Franz Schubert: Neue Ausgabe sämtlicher Wërke. Series I. Volume 3a "Messen III". Kassel: Bärenreiter, 1980.
Doris Finke-Hecklinger (ed). Franz Schubert: Neue Ausgabe sämtlicher Wërke. Series I. Volume 3b "Messen III". Kassel: Bärenreiter, 1980.
 and Volkmar von Pechstaedt (eds). Franz Schubert: Neue Ausgabe sämtlicher Wërke. Series I. Volume 5 "Messen-Sätze und Messen-Fragmente". Kassel: Bärenreiter, 1998.
Manuela Jahrmärker (ed). Franz Schubert: Neue Ausgabe sämtlicher Wërke. Series I. Volume 7 "Stabat mater (Jesus Christus schwebt am Kreuze)". Kassel: Bärenreiter, 1996.
 (ed). Franz Schubert: Neue Ausgabe sämtlicher Wërke. Series I. Volume 6 "Deutsche Messe/Deutsche Trauermesse". Kassel: Bärenreiter, 2001.
 (ed). Franz Schubert: Neue Ausgabe sämtlicher Wërke. Series II. Volume 12 "Adrast". Kassel: Bärenreiter, 2008.
Manuela Jahrmärker and Thomas Aigner (eds). Franz Schubert: Neue Ausgabe sämtlicher Wërke. Series II. Volume 15 "Sacontala". Kassel: Bärenreiter, 2008.
Manuela Jahrmärker (ed). Franz Schubert: Neue Ausgabe sämtlicher Wërke. Series II. Volume 17 "Der Graf von Gleichen". Kassel: Bärenreiter, 2006.
Dietrich Berke (ed). Franz Schubert: Neue Ausgabe sämtlicher Wërke. Series III. Volume 2a "Mehrstimmige Gesänge für gemischte Stimmen". Kassel: Bärenreiter, 1996.
Dietrich Berke (ed). Franz Schubert: Neue Ausgabe sämtlicher Wërke. Series III. Volume 2b "Mehrstimmige Gesänge für gemischte Stimmen". Kassel: Bärenreiter, 2006.
Dietrich Berke (ed). Franz Schubert: Neue Ausgabe sämtlicher Wërke. Series III. Volume 4 "Mehrstimmige Gesänge für gleiche Stimmen ohne Klavierbegleitung". Kassel: Bärenreiter, 1974.
Walther Dürr (ed). Franz Schubert: Neue Ausgabe sämtlicher Wërke. Series IV. Volume 1a "Lieder 1". Kassel: Bärenreiter, 1970.
Walther Dürr (ed). Franz Schubert: Neue Ausgabe sämtlicher Wërke. Series IV. Volume 1b "Lieder 1". Kassel: Bärenreiter, 1970.
Walther Dürr (ed). Franz Schubert: Neue Ausgabe sämtlicher Wërke. Series IV. Volume 2a "Lieder 2". Kassel: Bärenreiter, 1975.
Walther Dürr (ed). Franz Schubert: Neue Ausgabe sämtlicher Wërke. Series IV. Volume 2b "Lieder 2". Kassel: Bärenreiter, 1975.
Walther Dürr (ed). Franz Schubert: Neue Ausgabe sämtlicher Wërke. Series IV. Volume 3a "Lieder 3". Kassel: Bärenreiter, 1982.
Walther Dürr (ed). Franz Schubert: Neue Ausgabe sämtlicher Wërke. Series IV. Volume 3b "Lieder 3". Kassel: Bärenreiter, 1982.
Walther Dürr (ed). Franz Schubert: Neue Ausgabe sämtlicher Wërke. Series IV. Volume 4a "Lieder 4". Kassel: Bärenreiter, 1979.
Walther Dürr (ed). Franz Schubert: Neue Ausgabe sämtlicher Wërke. Series IV. Volume 4b "Lieder 4". Kassel: Bärenreiter, 1979.
Walther Dürr (ed). Franz Schubert: Neue Ausgabe sämtlicher Wërke. Series IV. Volume 5a "Lieder 5". Kassel: Bärenreiter, 1985.
Walther Dürr (ed). Franz Schubert: Neue Ausgabe sämtlicher Wërke. Series IV. Volume 5b "Lieder 5". Kassel: Bärenreiter, 1985.
Walther Dürr (ed). Franz Schubert: Neue Ausgabe sämtlicher Wërke. Series IV. Volume 6 "Lieder 6". Kassel: Bärenreiter, 1969.
Walther Dürr (ed). Franz Schubert: Neue Ausgabe sämtlicher Wërke. Series IV. Volume 7 "Lieder 7". Kassel: Bärenreiter, 1968.
Walther Dürr (ed). Franz Schubert: Neue Ausgabe sämtlicher Wërke. Series IV. Volume 8 "Lieder 8". Kassel: Bärenreiter, 2009.
Walther Dürr (ed). Franz Schubert: Neue Ausgabe sämtlicher Wërke. Series IV. Volume 9 "Lieder 9". Kassel: Bärenreiter, 2011.
Walther Dürr (ed). Franz Schubert: Neue Ausgabe sämtlicher Wërke. Series IV. Volume 10 "Lieder 10". Kassel: Bärenreiter, 2002.
Walther Dürr (ed). Franz Schubert: Neue Ausgabe sämtlicher Wërke. Series IV. Volume 11 "Lieder 11". Kassel: Bärenreiter, 1999.
Walther Dürr (ed). Franz Schubert: Neue Ausgabe sämtlicher Wërke. Series IV. Volume 12 "Lieder 12". Kassel: Bärenreiter, 1996.
Walther Dürr (ed). Franz Schubert: Neue Ausgabe sämtlicher Wërke. Series IV. Volume 13 "Lieder 13". Kassel: Bärenreiter, 1992.
Walther Dürr (ed). Franz Schubert: Neue Ausgabe sämtlicher Wërke. Series IV. Volume 14a "Lieder 14". Kassel: Bärenreiter, 1988.
Walther Dürr (ed). Franz Schubert: Neue Ausgabe sämtlicher Wërke. Series IV. Volume 14b "Lieder 14". Kassel: Bärenreiter, 1988.
Michael Kube (ed). Franz Schubert: Neue Ausgabe sämtlicher Wërke. Series V. Volume VI "Sinfonische Entwürfe und Fragmente". Kassel: Bärenreiter, 2012.
Michael Kube (ed). Franz Schubert: Neue Ausgabe sämtlicher Wërke. Series V. Volume VII "Konzertstücke". Kassel: Bärenreiter, 2008.
Arnold Feil (ed). Franz Schubert: Neue Ausgabe sämtlicher Wërke. Series VI. Volume 1 "Oktette und Nonette". Kassel: Bärenreiter, 1969.
Martin Chusid (ed). Franz Schubert: Neue Ausgabe sämtlicher Wërke. Series VI. Volume 2 "Streichquintette". Kassel: Bärenreiter, 1971.
Martin Chusid (ed). Franz Schubert: Neue Ausgabe sämtlicher Wërke. Series VI. Volume 3 "Streichquartette I". Kassel: Bärenreiter, 1979.
Werner Aderhold (ed). Franz Schubert: Neue Ausgabe sämtlicher Wërke. Series VI. Volume 4 "Streichquartette II". Kassel: Bärenreiter, 1994.
Werner Aderhold (ed). Franz Schubert: Neue Ausgabe sämtlicher Wërke. Series VI. Volume 5 "Streichquartette III". Kassel: Bärenreiter, 1989.
Werner Aderhold (ed). Franz Schubert: Neue Ausgabe sämtlicher Wërke. Series VI. Volume 6 "Streichtrios". Kassel: Bärenreiter, 1981.
Arnold Feil (ed). Franz Schubert: Neue Ausgabe sämtlicher Wërke. Series VI. Volume 7 "Werke für Klavier und mehrere Instrumente". Kassel: Bärenreiter, 1975.
Helmut Wirth (ed). Franz Schubert: Neue Ausgabe sämtlicher Wërke. Series VI. Volume 8 "Werke für Klavier und ein Instrument". Kassel: Bärenreiter, 1970.
Doris Finke-Hecklinger and Werner Aderhold (eds). Franz Schubert: Neue Ausgabe sämtlicher Wërke. Series VI. Volume 9 "Tänze für mehrere Instrumente". Kassel: Bärenreiter, 1991.
Walburga Litschauer (ed). Franz Schubert: Neue Ausgabe sämtlicher Wërke. Series VII Part 1. Volume 1 "Werke für Klavier zu vier Händen I". Kassel: Bärenreiter, 2007.
Christa Landon (ed). Franz Schubert: Neue Ausgabe sämtlicher Wërke. Series VII Part 1. Volume 2 "Werke für Klavier zu vier Händen II". Kassel: Bärenreiter, 1978.
Walburga Litschauer and Werner Aderhold (eds). Franz Schubert: Neue Ausgabe sämtlicher Wërke. Series VII Part 1. Volume 3 "Werke für Klavier zu vier Händen III". Kassel: Bärenreiter, 2011.
Christa Landon (ed). Franz Schubert: Neue Ausgabe sämtlicher Wërke. Series VII Part 1. Volume 4 "Märsche und Tänze". Kassel: Bärenreiter, 1972.
Walburga Litschauer (ed). Franz Schubert: Neue Ausgabe sämtlicher Wërke. Series VII Part 1. Volume 5 "Ouvertüren". Kassel: Bärenreiter, 1984.
Walburga Litschauer (ed). Franz Schubert: Neue Ausgabe sämtlicher Wërke. Series VII Part 2. Volume 1 "Klaviersonaten I". Kassel: Bärenreiter, 2000.
Walburga Litschauer (ed). Franz Schubert: Neue Ausgabe sämtlicher Wërke. Series VII Part 2. Volume 2 "Klaviersonaten II". Kassel: Bärenreiter, 2003.
Walburga Litschauer (ed). Franz Schubert: Neue Ausgabe sämtlicher Wërke. Series VII Part 2. Volume 3 "Klaviersonaten III". Kassel: Bärenreiter, 1996.
David Goldberger (ed). Franz Schubert: Neue Ausgabe sämtlicher Wërke. Series VII Part 2. Volume 4 "Klavierstücke I". Kassel: Bärenreiter, 1988.
Christa Landon and Walther Dürr (eds). Franz Schubert: Neue Ausgabe sämtlicher Wërke. Series VII Part 2. Volume 5 "Klavierstücke II". Kassel: Bärenreiter, 1984.
Walburga Litschauer (ed). Franz Schubert: Neue Ausgabe sämtlicher Wërke. Series VII Part 2. Volume 6 "Tänze I". Kassel: Bärenreiter, 1989.
Walburga Litschauer (ed). Franz Schubert: Neue Ausgabe sämtlicher Wërke. Series VII Part 2. Volume 7a "Tänze II". Kassel: Bärenreiter, 1990.
Alfred Mann (ed). Franz Schubert: Neue Ausgabe sämtlicher Wërke. Series VIII. Volume 2 "Schuberts Studien". Kassel: Bärenreiter, 1986.

External links
Bärenreiter-Verlag: New Schubert Edition
Franz Schubert Catalogue 310 – Opéras (Détails)
Franz Schubert (1797–1828) – The Complete Songs
Franz Schubert (1797–1828) – New Edition of the Complete Works
Schwind, Moritz. "Johann Michael Vogl and Franz Schubert marching"

l'Orchestra Virtuale del Flaminio: Franz Schubert – Catalogo delle composizioni versione completa
Neue Schubert-Ausgabe
Schubert autographs
Franz Schubert (1797–1828): Werke sortiert nach Opuszahl, klassika.info

Concordance